The 2012 Categoría Primera A season (officially known at the 2012 Liga Postobón season for sponsorship reasons) was the 65th season of Colombia's top-flight football league.

Format
Both the Apertura and Finalización had an identical format. Each championship was divided into three stages. The First Stage was contested on a home-and-away basis, with each team playing the other teams once and playing a regional rival once more. The top eight teams after eighteen rounds advanced to a semifinal round, of two groups of four playing once more on a home-and-away basis. The winner of each semifinal group advanced to the final of the tournament, which was played as a double-legged series. The winner of the final was declared the tournament champion and participated in the 2013 Copa Libertadores.

Teams

Torneo Apertura

First stage
The First Stage began on January 27 and consisted of eighteen rounds and a series of regional rivalries on the ninth round. The top eight teams out of this stage advanced to the Semifinals. The first stage ended on May 27.

Standings

Results

Semifinals
The Semifinal stage began on June 13 and ended on July 8. The eight teams that advanced were sorted into two groups of four teams. The winner of each group advanced to the finals.

Group A

Group B

Finals

Top goalscorers
Source:

Torneo Finalización

First stage

Standings

Results

Semifinals
The Semifinal stage began on November and ended on December. The eight teams that advanced were sorted into two groups of four teams. The winner of each group advanced to the finals.

Group A

Group B

Finals

Relegation
A separate table is kept to determine the teams that get relegated to the Categoría Primera B for the next season. The table includes an average of all first stage games played for the current season and the previous two seasons.

Rules for classification: 1st average; 2nd goal difference; 3rd number of goals scored; 4th away goals scored.

Aggregate table

An aggregate table including all games that a team plays during the year; is used to determine the First Stage berths to both the Copa Libertadores and the Copa Sudamericana. The best-placed non-champion will go to the first stage of the 2013 Copa Libertadores and the 2nd, 3rd, and 4th best-placed non-champions will go to the first stage of the 2013 Copa Sudamericana. Atlético Nacional is already qualified to the 2013 Copa Sudamericana as the champion of the 2012 Copa Colombia.

References

External links 
 DIMAYOR's official website 
 Official regulations 

Categoría Primera A seasons
Col
1